Erwin Branco Ampuero Vera (born 19 July 1993), known as Branco Ampuero, is a Chilean footballer that currently plays for Chilean club Universidad Católica as a defender.

Career statistics

Honours

Club
Deportes Puerto Montt
 Segunda División: 2018

Universidad Católica
 Primera División: 2018, 2021
 Supercopa de Chile: 2020, 2021

International
Chile
 China Cup: 2017

References

External links
 

1993 births
Living people
Chilean footballers
Chile international footballers
Association football defenders
Puerto Montt footballers
C.D. Antofagasta footballers
Club Deportivo Universidad Católica footballers
Chilean Primera División players
Primera B de Chile players
21st-century Chilean people